Wien Consolidated Airlines Flight 55 was a scheduled domestic passenger flight in Alaska that crashed into Pedro Bay on 2 December 1968, killing all 39 on board. The Fairchild F-27B aircraft was operated by Wien Consolidated Airlines and was en route to Dillingham from Anchorage, with three intermediate stops. The NTSB investigation revealed that the aircraft suffered a structural failure after encountering "severe-to-extreme" air turbulence. The accident was the second-worst accident involving a Fairchild F-27 at the time, and currently the third-worst accident involving the aircraft.

Flight 
Flight 55 was served by a Fairchild F-27B, a twin-engine propjet aircraft that had been in service since 1959. The aircraft was piloted by Captain David Stanley, who had been a pilot for Northern Consolidated Airlines for seven years before that airline was merged into Wien Consolidated Airlines. Prior to that, he had been a flight instructor in Anchorage, and was described as an excellent pilot.

At 9:25 am, first officer Jerry Svengard contacted Iliamna air traffic control to request an approach clearance, which was granted at 9:26 am. This was the last outside contact made with the crew of Flight 55.

Crash 
Local witnesses reported hearing an explosion and seeing a fireball in the vicinity of the aircraft's tail before it descended in a steep, uncontrolled spiral towards the ground. Other witnesses reported large quantities of black smoke from behind the wing of the aircraft, and that the plane continued on course for a short period of time, before pieces separated from the aircraft and it entered a dive. The aircraft crashed into Foxys Lake, Pedro Bay, an area described as being a frozen marshland surrounded by mountains.

An Air Force helicopter was able to reach the crash site that afternoon, but was forced by the wind to take off shortly thereafter. The pilot, Major Norman Kahmoot, reported that there were no survivors, and that the aircraft had been so disfigured by the crash that it was no longer recognizable. Bodies had been scattered across a large area, and local Athabascan villagers volunteered to guard the remains from wolves until they could be collected and taken to the temporary morgue.

The NTSB investigation lasted 19 months, and it was discovered that a number of fatigue cracks had formed on the aircraft's wings due to improper and shoddy maintenance. The stresses due to turbulence and air pressure caused a structural failure in the aircraft's right wing, forcing it into a spiraling, uncontrollable dive.

See also 
 List of accidents and incidents involving airliners in the United States

References 

Aviation accidents and incidents in the United States in 1968
Airliner accidents and incidents caused by in-flight structural failure
Airliner accidents and incidents in Alaska
Accidents and incidents involving the Fairchild F-27
Wien Air Alaska accidents and incidents
Lake and Peninsula Borough, Alaska
1968 in Alaska
December 1968 events in the United States